Austin is an abandoned town in the Murchison region of Western Australia. The town is located south of Cue on an island in Lake Austin and for this reason was also known as Lake Austin and The Island Lake Austin.

The lake and the town are both named after surveyor Robert Austin, who was the first European to explore and chart the area. Austin initially named the lake the Great Inland Marsh but the name was later changed to Lake Austin. The townsite was gazetted in 1895.

When Austin travelled through the area he described it as very indifferent but also added the geological features indicate rich goldfields.

The town had one ten head stamp mill operating the Austin mine just outside town in 1895.

Transport to and from the town was originally provided by a bi-weekly coach from Yalgoo but by 1898 the railway was extended to the town.

The townsite is still visible from the Great Northern Highway.

References 

Ghost towns in Western Australia
Shire of Cue
Ghost towns in the Mid West of Western Australia